This is the videography for American rapper Jay-Z. They often involve him performing.

As lead artist

As featured artist

Television

References

External links 
 Official website
 Jay-Z at AllMusic

Discography
Discographies of American artists
Videographies of American artists
Hip hop discographies